Carrie Tiffany (born 1965) is an English-born Australian novelist and former park ranger.

Biography
Tiffany was born in Halifax, West Yorkshire and migrated to Australia with her family in the early 1970s. She grew up in Perth, Western Australia. In her early twenties she worked as a park ranger in Central Australia.

She moved to Melbourne in 1988 where she began work as a writer, focusing mainly on agriculture. Tiffany took up writing fiction and completed a creative writing course. She completed a master's degree in Creative Writing at RMIT University and is working towards her doctorate at La Trobe University.

Tiffany's debut novel, Everyman's Rules for Scientific Living, was a remarkable success on its release in 2005, winning several awards and shortlisted for some major awards, including the Miles Franklin Award and the Orange Prize.

Her second novel, Mateship with Birds, was published in 2012, while her third novel, Exploded View, was published in 2019 to critical acclaim.

Awards and nominations
Everyman's Rules for Scientific Living
2003 won the Victorian Premier's Literary Award for an unpublished manuscript
2005 won the Western Australian Premier's Book Award for Fiction
2006 shortlisted for the Guardian First Book Award
2006 shortlisted for the Miles Franklin Award
2007 winner of the Dobbie Encouragement Award
2006 shortlisted for the Victorian Premier's Literary Award Vance Palmer Prize for Fiction
2007 shortlisted for the Orange Prize for Fiction

Mateship with Birds
2012 shortlisted for the Victorian Premier's Literary Award
2012 shortlisted for the Melbourne Prize for Literature Best Writing Award
2013 won the inaugural Stella Prize
2013 shortlisted for the Miles Franklin Award
2013 won the Christina Stead Prize for Fiction in the New South Wales Premier's Literary Awards
2013 shortlisted for the Women's Prize for Fiction

Exploded View

2019 won the University of Queensland Fiction Book Award
2020 shortlisted for the Miles Franklin Award
2020 shortlisted for ALS Gold Medal
2020 shortlisted for Voss Literary Prize

Bibliography
 Everyman's Rules for Scientific Living (Pan Macmillan Australia, 2005) 
 Mateship with Birds (Pan Macmillan Australia, 2012) 
 Exploded View (Text Publishing, 2019)

Notes

References
 Guardian First Book Award 2006 Guardian News and Media Limited (Retrieved 1 August 2007)
  Orange Broadband Prize for Fiction, Shortlist 2007, Wednesday 1 August 2007 (retrieved 1 August 2007)
 Carrie Tiffany, Author/Agriculturalist Journalist Booked Out Agency (Retrieved 1 August 2007)
 The Vance Palmer Prize for Fiction: Shortlist 2006 State Library of Victoria (Retrieved 1 August 2007)

External links
Interview with Tiffany
 Rules for Scientific Living reviewed by Ziauddin Sardar Orange Prize (Retrieved 1 August 2007)

1965 births
Living people
RMIT University alumni
English emigrants to Australia
Australian women novelists